Joukahainen is a character in the Kalevala, the Finnish epic poem. He is a rival of the main character, Väinämöinen.

Description

After clashing with their horses and challenging Väinämöinen to a fight, they engage in a battle of song. He loses and is magically sung into being swallowed by a mire. In his plea for help from Väinämöinen, he pledges his sister Aino to him. But she objects to Väinämöinen, and rather than marrying him she drowns herself. Joukahainen is enraged by all that has taken place and even though his mother tries to stop him, he ambushes Väinämöinen with his crossbow. Joukahainen misses Väinämöinen but hits and kills his horse from under him, making him plunge into the icy waters of Pohjola.

In the original translation into English (by John Martin Crawford (1888)) this character's name was Anglicised as Youkahainen.

Gallery

References

Characters in the Kalevala